HRC or hrc may refer to:

Transportation
 South Atlantic Airways (ICAO airline code)
 Zhayrem Airport (IATA code), Zhayrem, Kazakhstan
 Hercules station (Amtrak station code), Hercules, California, US

Organizations
 Harry Ransom Center, a museum, library, and archive of the University of Texas
 Hellenic Red Cross, the Greek Red Cross Society
 Hertford Regional College, a further education college in Hertfordshire
 Honda Racing Corporation, a racing division of the Honda Motor Company
 Human Rights Campaign, an LGBT equal rights organization
 Human rights commission, a body to protect human rights
 United Nations Human Rights Committee, a United Nations body of 18 experts that meets three times a year for four-week sessions
 United Nations Human Rights Council, a United Nations inter-governmental body that includes representation by 47 member states 
 United States Army Human Resources Command, a command agency for career management of United States Army and Army Reserve soldiers
 Hill-Rom Holdings (NYSE ticker symbol), US
 Hard Rock Cafe, a chain of theme restaurants featuring rock-and-roll music and memorabilia
 Hollandia Roeiclub, a Dutch rowing club, featured in the movie The Social Network (2010)

Science and technology
 HRC, the C-scale of the Rockwell scale for measuring the indentation hardness of a material
 HRC (gene), the human gene for the histidine rich calcium binding protein
 Harmonically-related carriers, a cable TV signal modulation technique
 High Resistance Connection, an undesirable phenomenon resulting from loose or poor connections in electrical circuits
 High rupturing capacity, a type of fuse that can safely interrupt a high electric current
 High-Resolution Channel, a feature of the Hubble Space Telescope that has light suppression options to mask out bright astronomical sources
 Hitachi Remote Copy, a remote mirroring feature for data storage arrays

Other uses
 Helsinki Rugby Club, a rugby union team located in Helsinki, Finland.
 Niwer Mil language (ISO 639 code: hrc)
 Hillary Rodham Clinton (born 1947), US former First Lady, Senator, Secretary of State, and presidential candidate
 HRC: State Secrets and the Rebirth of Hillary Clinton, a 2014 book about Hillary Rodham Clinton 
 Hot Rod Circuit, a US indie rock band